Bilal Khan (born 10 April 1988) is a Pakistani-born cricketer who plays for the Oman national cricket team. He made his Twenty20 International debut for Oman against Hong Kong on 21 November 2015. He was the top wicket-taker in the series, with seven dismissals.

In January 2018, he was named in Oman's squad for the 2018 ICC World Cricket League Division Two tournament. He made his List A debut for Oman on 8 February 2018.

In August 2018, he was named in Oman's squad for the 2018 Asia Cup Qualifier tournament. He was the leading wicket-taker for Oman in the tournament, with ten dismissals in five matches. In October 2018, he was named in Oman's squad for the 2018 ICC World Cricket League Division Three tournament. Ahead of the tournament, he was named as the player to watch in Oman's squad. He finished the tournament as the leading wicket-taker, with twelve dismissals in five matches, and was named as the player of the series. In December 2018, he was named in Oman's team for the 2018 ACC Emerging Teams Asia Cup.

In March 2019, he was named in Oman's team for the 2019 ICC World Cricket League Division Two tournament in Namibia. Oman finished in the top four places in the tournament, therefore gaining One Day International (ODI) status. Khan made his ODI debut for Oman on 27 April 2019, against Namibia, in the tournament's final.

In September 2019, he was named in Oman's squad for the 2019 ICC T20 World Cup Qualifier tournament. He was the leading wicket-taker in the tournament, with eighteen dismissals in nine matches. In September 2021, he was named in Oman's squad for the 2021 ICC Men's T20 World Cup, with the International Cricket Council (ICC) later naming him as the key player in Oman's team.

In March 2022, in the opening match of the 2022 United Arab Emirates Tri-Nation Series, Khan took his first five-wicket haul in an ODI match, with 5/31 from 9.5 overs.

References

External links
 

1988 births
Living people
Omani cricketers
Oman One Day International cricketers
Oman Twenty20 International cricketers
Cricketers from Peshawar
Pakistani emigrants to Oman
Pakistani expatriates in Oman